Robert Hartford-Davis (born William Henry Davis, 23 July 1923 – 12 June 1977) was a British born producer, director and writer, who worked on film and television in both in the United Kingdom and United States.  He is also sometimes credited as Michael Burrowes or Robert Hartford.

Biography
Hartford-Davis was born in Ramsgate, Kent in 1923 as William Henry Davis; he changed his name on becoming a television director in 1955. His television career encompassed drama, comedy and entertainment shows. Bob, as he liked to be called, started his career as an electrician in a South London film studio, where he went on to develop his skills as a cameraman. During the fifties he made a number of short films. These were innovative with the choice of cast and script content. In the late fifties he became an agent and worked for Roy Rogers, amongst others (in England).

His talents included co-writing many scripts for 'exploitation' movies and he used media events and people to forward his career. The Yellow Teddy Bears is a prime example of his vivid imagination, using an article in a national newspaper as fodder.

Robert dealt with the downturn of the film industry in the UK by investing his own money in two movies, The Fiend and Nobody Ordered Love.

Personal life
Hartford-Davis married Betty Hale in 1943 and there were three children from this marriage;  Jean, Marian and Penelope were born in the next ten years. His wife also co-wrote I'm Not Bothered and an innovative play on the trial of Christ, We the Guilty. Robert and Betty were divorced in 1957. Robert went on to marry three or four four more times. There was also another son, Scott Hartford-Davis, born in the late fifties.

Robert died on June 12, 1977 from a massive stroke.

Filmography
1956: I'm Not Bothered (TV series)
1960: Police Surgeon (TV series)
1962: Crosstrap
1963: That Kind of Girl
1963: The Yellow Teddy Bears
1964: The Black Torment
1964: Saturday Night Out
1965: Gonks Go Beat
1966: The Sandwich Man
1968: Corruption
1969: The Smashing Bird I Used to Know (a.k.a. School for Unclaimed Girls)
1971: Nobody Ordered Love
1971: Incense for the Damned
1972: The Fiend
1972: Black Gunn
1974: The Take
1977: Dog and Cat (TV series)

External links 

Robert Hartford-Davis at Hollywood.com

1923 births
1977 deaths
English film directors
English film producers
People from Ramsgate
20th-century English businesspeople
British expatriates in the United States